Adam Mensah Osei Afriyie (born 4 August 1965) is a British politician who has served as the Member of Parliament (MP) for Windsor since 2005. He is a member of the Conservative Party.

Early life
The son of an English mother and a Ghanaian father, Afriyie was born in Wimbledon, London, and grew up on a council estate in Peckham, attending the local Oliver Goldsmith Primary School. He was educated at Addey and Stanhope School in New Cross, and earned a bachelor's degree in agricultural economics from Wye College in 1987.

Afriyie has seven half-siblings and one brother. He said of his upbringing: "I never knew my father until I was much older and my mother, Gwen, brought us up alone. She was my rock, the gel at the centre of my life, although her tumultuous relationships with different men made for a constant state of flux at the boundaries of our family."

Business career 
Afriyie was chairman of Connect Support Services, an IT support company he set up in 1993. The company went into liquidation in 2017 and was sold by administrators. The company owed £1.8 million in taxes to HMRC. He owned two thirds of DeHavilland, a political monitoring company, which was sold to publishers Emap in 2005 for £18 million. He was also a regional finalist in the 2003 Ernst and Young Entrepreneur of the Year Awards.

He was a governor of the Museum of London, appointed by Tony Blair, a trustee of the Museum in Docklands (part of the Museum of London) and, from 2003 to 2005, a director of Policy Exchange, a centre right think tank. 

Afriyie was a stakeholder of Axonn Media (originally called Adfero, an asset remaining from the sale of DeHavilland), a content marketing business which produces content for clients. The company incorporated brands such as Content Plus, NewsReach, DirectNews and ReelContent. Axonn turned over £9.4m in 2011, and made a pre tax profit of £1.3m. Afriyie was the largest shareholder of the firm, and he and his fellow directors split dividends of £2.2m in 2010 and 2011. The company went into liquidation in 2019, owing HMRC taxes of £492,000. Axonn was sold for £39,000, its annual turnover having fallen by over £7 million since 2013.

Afriyie became board chairman of Elite Growth, a medical cannabis firm, in 2021.

Following a 2021 court petition from HMRC, Afriyie was declared bankrupt in December 2022, owing around £1 million in taxes and £700,000 to Barclays bank.

Political career 

A member of the Conservative Party since 1990, Afriyie in 1999 worked for Jeffrey Archer on his unsuccessful campaign to be the first directly elected Mayor of London.

Afriyie was selected as parliamentary candidate for the constituency of Windsor in October 2003. He was first elected at the 2005 general election, with an increased share of the vote (49.5%) and a swing to the Conservatives of 1.2%.

He is the Conservative Party's first mixed-race MP, although he said in an interview with the Evening Standard that he considers himself not as black but "post-racial". He made his maiden speech on 23 May 2005. In the election of 2010, Afriyie was re elected, with an increased share of the vote (60.8%) and a swing to the Conservatives of 11.4%.

In Parliament, he was a member of the Science and Technology Select Committee from 2005, until its abolition in July 2007, and has since been a member of the Children, Schools and Families select committee. Since 2010, he has been the President of the Conservative Technology Forum. He was the chair of the Parliamentary Office of Science and Technology between 2010 and 2017.

Afriyie voted against the Marriage (Same Sex Couples) Bill, citing his fear for religious freedom, and also that he thought that straight civil partnerships should be allowed, but the Bill did not include this.

In November 2013, Afriyie proposed an amendment to the European Union (Referendum) Bill 2013–14, to force an early vote for an early referendum on membership of the European Union, against the express wishes of his party. He continued to advocate an early referendum after his rebel amendment was easily defeated in the House of Commons with just 6% of the vote, citing public support for such a move.

In December 2014, Afriyie with six other Conservative MPs voted against the Equal Pay (Transparency) Bill, which would require all companies with more than 250 employees to declare the gap in pay between the average male and average female salaries. He was mooted as a possible candidate for a challenge to David Cameron for leadership of the Conservative Party, but there was little support within the party for a leadership challenge or Afriyie as a potential candidate.

He is a steering committee member of the COVID Recovery Group, a group of Conservative MPs who opposed the UK government's December 2020 lockdown. According to The Telegraph'''s Christopher Hope the anti-lockdown group would be seen in Westminster as an "echo" of the Brexiteer European Research Group (ERG) of MPs, and a response by backbench Conservatives to Nigel Farage's anti-lockdown Reform UK party.

In November 2021, HMRC filed a petition for bankruptcy against Afriyie. In the past a declaration of bankruptcy would have led to his disqualification as an MP, but that now only happens if a Bankruptcy Restriction Order, imposed in cases of malfeasance or culpability, is issued. During May 2022 the Insolvency and Companies Court adjourned the petition for three months to give him time to realise funds. He was declared bankrupt in December 2022, owing around £1 million in taxes to HMRC and £700,000 to Barclays bank.

In May 2022, the House of Commons standards body reprimanded Afriyie for failing to register his role as board chairman of Elite Growth, a cannabis distribution company. Afriyie had tried to get the Commons registry staff to retrospectively alter the records to make it to appear as if he had registered his role at the firm. Three years before, in 2019, the Commons standards commissioner reprimanded the MP for failing to declare income from letting his Windsor house through Airbnb for £2,000 a night.

In July 2022, Afriyie announced he would stand down at the next general election.

Personal life
In May 2004, Adam and Romi Afriyie won a libel case against The Mail on Sunday over a published article, "What IDS's Mr Perfect didn't tell Tory bosses". The article was called a "hatchet job" by Darcus Howe in the New Statesman''. In August 2005 he married his second and current wife Tracy-Jane (née Newell), a barrister and former wife of Kit Malthouse, then deputy leader of Westminster City Council.

In February 2013, Afriyie's wealth was estimated at £13 million to £100 million. , Afriyie owned a large house in Westminster, as well as "The Priory" in Old Windsor.

In November 2021, HMRC submitted a petition to the high court to have Afriyie declared bankrupt for unpaid taxes. The MP intended to defend himself in court over the petition. On 13 December 2022, Afriyie was declared bankrupt at the High Court of Justice: he owed around £1 million in taxes to HMRC and £700,000 to Barclays bank.

References

External links

Adam Afriyie MP, Conservative Party profile
Windsor Conservatives

 

Living people
1965 births
Alumni of Wye College
Black British politicians
Conservative Party (UK) MPs for English constituencies
English people of Ghanaian descent
People educated at Addey and Stanhope School
People from Peckham
Members of the Parliament of the United Kingdom for Windsor
UK MPs 2005–2010
UK MPs 2010–2015
UK MPs 2015–2017
UK MPs 2017–2019
UK MPs 2019–present
Black British MPs